Omaha High School may refer to:

Omaha High School (Arkansas) — Omaha, Arkansas
Norris City-Omaha-Enfield High School — Norris City, Illinois
Several schools in Omaha, Nebraska
Omaha Benson High School
Omaha Bryan High School
Omaha Burke High School
Omaha Career Center School
Omaha Central High School - initially itself known as Omaha High School
Omaha North High School
Omaha Northwest High School
Omaha South High School